Hororo may refer to:

Hororo (Bantu), a Bantu tribe living in northern Uganda
Hororo (Florida), or Jororo, an extinct Native American tribe who once lived in what is now the U.S. state of Florida